Cairo de Assis Trindade (born in Porto Alegre, 1946. - Rio de Janeiro, 11 December 2019), better known as Cairo Trindade, is a Brazilian poet, short story writer, chronicler, dramaturge, editor, performer, actor and literary advisor.

Career 
In 1968, he moved to Rio de Janeiro.

He was one of the creators of the Porn Art Movement in the 80's, having organized the "Topless Literário", a nudist parade along the Copacabana border. He and his wife Denizis Trindade form the "Dupla do Prazer", with poetic performances.

He published anthologies of authors of his literary workshop and participated in the Fresta Literária, an erotic poetry slam organized by the poet Vinni Corrêa.

His works were exhibited in museums in Brazil, Germany and other countries.

Bibliography 

Poetry

 PoetAstro (1974)
 Saca na geral (1980)
 Liberatura (1990)
 Poematemagia (2001)
 Poesya, que porra é essa? (2011)

Dramaturgy

 Verbenas de Seda (1973)
 Raízes e Asas (1978)

Anthologies

 Antolorgia: Arte Pornô (1984)

References

External links
 Cairo Trindade own website (in Portuguese)
 Cairo Trindade and The Porn Art Movement (in Portuguese)
 Article about Poesya, by Cairo Trindade (in Portuguese)
 Article about Cairo Trindade (in Portuguese)
 Literatura Digital (in Portuguese)
 Article Artes Obcenas em Foco (in Portuguese)
 Interview "Sem abertura para a alegria, não existe poesia na escrita; existe morte" (in Portuguese)
 2 poems by Cairo Trindade – Revista Philos

21st-century Brazilian poets
Brazilian male poets
1948 births
Living people
People from Porto Alegre
21st-century Brazilian male writers
20th-century Brazilian poets
20th-century Brazilian male writers